Sphyranthera is a plant genus of the family Euphorbiaceae and the only genus of its tribe (Sphyranthereae). It was first described in 1887. The entire genus is endemic to the Andaman & Nicobar Islands in the Bay of Bengal, politically part of India but geographically closer to Myanmar.

Species
Sphyranthera airyshawii Chakrab. & Vasudeva Rao - N Andaman Islands
Sphyranthera lutescens (Kurz) Pax & K.Hoffm. - N Nicobar Islands + C Andaman Islands

References

Euphorbiaceae genera
Acalyphoideae
Flora of the Andaman Islands
Flora of the Nicobar Islands